María Isabel Solari Poggio (born June 18, 1983), known as Liz Solari, is an Argentine actress who began her career as a model, before becoming established in local and foreign cinema. She is a UNICEF Ambassador in Argentina.

Biography
She was born on June 18, 1983, in Barranquilla, Colombia where her father, (Eduardo Solari), was a football coach directing Junior de Barranquilla. Her family returned to Argentina when she was three years old. Her uncle Jorge and three brothers Esteban, David and Santiago were all professional footballers. 

In 2001, she won an international competition of the Dotto Models agency, owned by Pancho Dotto, which effectively launched her modeling career. She lent her face to national and international prestigious brands, and she consolidated as a top model in South-America. She lived in the United States and then in Europe for two years, where she worked for designers such as Roberto Cavalli and Jean-Paul Gaultier. She was the face of brands such as Zara, Ripley, Almacenes Paris, Taft, Carpisa, Scunci, and other international brands such as Pantene, Veet, Sedal.

In 2008, Liz began her career as actress. She worked in the film El Desafio, the Argentinean version of High School Musical, and then she starred in the play "Barbie Live" ., which was a clear success in Argentina, Uruguay, Peru and Brazil. In this comedy, she acts, sings and dances. In 2009 she starred in the TV series Champs 12 at América TV. The series was broadcast in Argentina, Spain, Italy, Turkey and Israel. In May 2010 she moved to London, England, where she did an acting master at the Central School of Speech and Drama. When finished, she attended advanced classes at Lamda.

In May 2011 she co-starred, together with Enrico Brignano, in the Italian film Ex – Amici come prima! under the direction of the famous Italian director Carlo Vanzina. And afterwards, she started shooting for the comedy Benvenuti a tavola – Nord vs Sud, broadcast in 2012 in Italy. She gained the Italian public recognition. In February 2012 she shot under the direction of the director Adrián Caetano, on his film "Mala". Additionally, she started shooting for Polka's TV series "Sos mi hombre". She began the year 2013 working on cinema with two films, the new production of Diego Rafecas, "First Law", and "Amapola" of the director Eugenio Zanetti. On the same year, she starred the TV special "Historias del corazón" for Telefé channel. In 2014 she was the host, together with Enrico Brignano, of "Il Meglio d'Italia", a TV show broadcast by Rai 1 for the entire Italy. Then, she starred in "Sei mai stata sulla Luna?", a Paolo Genovese film which was released on January 22, 2015, in all Italy.

In 2015, she filmed "Estocolmo" a new TV serie that was released on Netflix in 2016, in which her role was "Larisa". In 2016 she starred in the movie Permitidos, a film directed by Ariel Winograd. In 2016 she starred in three new movies. The Last Man is her first film to be released in USA in 2018, starring Harvey Keitel and Hayden Christensen.

Television, Cinema and Theatre

Television

Films

Theatre

References

External links

 
 Official Site

1983 births
Living people
Actresses from Rosario, Santa Fe
Argentine female models
Alumni of the Royal Central School of Speech and Drama
Argentine television actresses
Argentine film actresses
People from Barranquilla
Citizens of Argentina through descent
Argentine people of Italian descent
21st-century Argentine women
Bailando por un Sueño (Argentine TV series) participants